Ou Xifan was a robber from the Northern Song Dynasty (CE X-XII c.) who was killed and dissected, along with 56 of his followers 

For a culture where the dissection of human bodies was seen as unethical, as described by confucian filial piety, the bodies of rebels and criminals provided the Chinese dynasties rare opportunities for learning about their bodies.

References

See also 
History of anatomy
Chinese medicine
Filial piety
Medicine in China
History of science and technology in China

Song dynasty people
Chinese robbers